The masculine given name Sander is a variant of Alexander, used in the Dutch-speaking areas of Europe (chiefly the Netherlands and northern Belgium), as well as Norway and Estonia. As of 1 January 2021, it is the 34th most common masculine given name in Estonia. The feminine version is Sandra; there is another masculine version in some countries: Sandro.

Given name
Sander Armée (born 1985), Belgian cyclist
Sander Baart (born 1988), Dutch field hockey player and Olympic competitor
Sander Berk (born 1979), Dutch triathlete and Olympic competitor
Sander Boschker (born 1970), Dutch footballer
Sander Coopman (born 1995), Belgian footballer 
Sander Cordeel (born 1987), Belgian road bicycle racer
Sander Debroux (born 1982), Belgian footballer
Sander Dekker (born 1975), Dutch politician 
Sander van Doorn (born 1979), Dutch electronic musician & DJ
Sander Dreesmann (born 1977), Dutch field hockey player
Sander Duits (born 1983), Dutch footballer 
Sander Fischer (born 1988), Dutch footballer
Sander van Gessel (born 1976), Dutch footballer 
Sander Gilman (born 1944), American cultural and literary historian
Sander Gommans (born 1978), Dutch heavy metal singer and musician 
Sander Griffioen (born 1941), Dutch philosopher and educator 
Sander Groen (born 1968), Dutch tennis player
Sander Heesakkers (born 1995), Dutch footballer
Sander Helven (born 1990), Belgian cyclist 
Sander Kleinenberg (born 1971), Dutch DJ and record producer
Sander Jan Klerk (born 1982), Dutch actor and singer
Sander Lantinga (born 1976), Dutch radio personality
Sander Levin (born 1931), American politician
Sander MacKilljan, Dutch mixed martial artist
Sander Sandy Nelson (1938–2022), American rock and roll drummer
Sander Pärn (born 1992), Estonian rally driver
Sander Post (born 1984), Estonian footballer
Sander Puri (born 1988),  Estonian footballer
Sander Raieste (born 1999), Estonian basketball player
Sander de Rouwe (born 1980), Dutch politician
Sander Rozema (born 1987), Dutch footballer 
Sander Rue (born 1948), American politician 
Sander Sagosen (born 1995), Norwegian handball player
Sander Schnitger (born 1958) Dutch general in the Royal Netherlands Air Force
Sander Schwartz (born 1954), American television animation producer
Sander Schutgens (born 1975) Dutch runner
Sander Skogli (born 1993), Norwegian ice hockey player
Sander Steen (born 1986), American rock drummer  
Sander van de Streek (born 1993), Dutch footballer
Sander Svendsen (born 1997), Norwegian footballer
Sander Thoenes (1968–1999), Dutch journalist 
Sander Thonhauser, Dutch mixed martial artist
Sander Vanocur (1928–2019), American journalist
Siim-Sander Vene (born 1990), Estonian basketball player
Sander Vos (born 1967), Dutch film editor
Sander van der Weide (born 1976), Dutch field hockey player and Olympic medalist
Sander Westerveld (born 1974), Dutch footballer
Sander de Wijn (born 1990), Dutch field hockey player and Olympic competitor
Sander P. Zwegers (born 1975), Dutch mathematician

Surname
Anne Sander (politician) (born 1973), French politician
August Sander (1876–1964), German photographer
B. J. Sander (born 1980), American football player
Brenden Sander (born 1995), American volleyball player 
Chris Sander (scientist), computational biologist
Emily Sander (1989–2007), American model
Friedrich Wilhelm Sander (1885–1938), German pyrotechnics engineer and manufacturer
Heidemarie Jiline "Jil" Sander (born 1943), German fashion designer
Helge Sander (born 1950), Danish politician
Henry Frederick Conrad Sander (1847–1920), German-born British publisher, orchidologist and nurseryman
Jean-Marie Sander (born 1949), French farmer, politician and banker
Mart Sander (born 1967), Estonian singer, actor, director, author and television host
Otto Sander (1941-2013), German film, theatre, and voice actor
Paige Sander (born 1995), American volleyball player
Petrik Sander (born 1960), German footballer
Taylor Sander (born 1992), American volleyball player

Fictional characters
Sander Cohen is a character in the 2007 video game BioShock.
Sander Driesen is a character in the Belgian series WTFock.

See also
Sandra (given name)
Xander
Xandra (disambiguation)
Sanders (surname)
Alexander

References

Short description of a name (in Dutch)

Masculine given names
German masculine given names
Dutch masculine given names
Estonian masculine given names

nl:Sander